Ameloctopus litoralis is a species of octopus in the family Octopodidae. It belongs to the monotypic genus Ameloctopus. It is found in shallow waters in tropical Australia and lacks an ink sack.  Ameloctopus litoralis lays large eggs compared to other octopuses.

References

 Norman, M. D. (1992). Ameloctopus litoralis gen. et sp. nov. (Cephalopoda: Octopodidae), a new shallow-water octopus from tropical Australian waters. Invertebrate Taxonomy, 6 . pp. 567–582.

Octopodidae
Monotypic mollusc genera